The Ligue 2 season 2008–09 was the sixty-seventh edition since its establishment, and began on 1 August 2008 and ended on 29 May 2009. The fixtures were announced on 23 May 2008.

Promotion and relegation
Teams relegated to Ligue 2
FC Metz, relegated after losing to Olympique Marseille on 12 April 2008.
RC Strasbourg, relegated after losing to SM Caen on 10 May 2008.
RC Lens, relegated after drawing with FC Girondins de Bordeaux on 17 May 2008.

Teams promoted to Ligue 1
Le Havre AC, promoted after drawing with CS Sedan on 22 April 2008.
FC Nantes, promoted after drawing with Montpellier HSC on 25 April 2008.
Grenoble Foot 38, promoted after drawing with LB Châteauroux on 12 May 2008.

Teams promoted from Championnat National
Vannes OC, promoted after losing to FC Martigues on 26 April 2008.
Tours FC, promoted after defeating Stade Laval on 3 May 2008.
Nimes Olympique, promoted after defeating Stade Laval on 16 May 2008.

Teams relegated to Championnat National
FC Gueugnon, relegated after losing to AC Ajaccio on 18 April 2008.
FC Libourne-Saint-Seurin, relegated after losing to CS Sedan on 2 May 2008.
Chamois Niortais FC, relegated after losing to US Boulogne on 16 May 2008.

League table

Results

Statistics

Top goalscorers
Grégory Thil wins the Ligue 2 Trophée du Meilleur Buteur.

Last updated: 30 May 2009
Source: Ligue 2

Assists table
Paul Alo'o wins the Ligue 2 Trophée du Meilleur Passeur.

Last updated: 30 May 2009
Source: Ligue 2

UNFP Player of the Month

Awards

Player of the Year
The nominees for Ligue 2 Player of the Year. The winner will be determine at the annual UNFP Awards on 24 May. The winner will be displayed in bold.

Keeper of the Year
The nominees for the Ligue 2 Goalkeeper of the Year. The winner will be displayed in bold.

Manager of the Year
The nominees for Manager of the Year. The winner will be displayed in bold.

Team of the Year

Managers

Stadia

Last updated 22 May 2009

Teams by region

References

External links
French League Official Site
Ligue 2 Official Page

Ligue 2 seasons
French
2